The Royal Danish Academy of Music, or Royal Danish Conservatory of Music, in Copenhagen is the oldest professional institution of musical education in Denmark as well as the largest, with approximately 400 students. It was established in 1867 as Kjøbenhavns Musikkonservatorium by Niels Gade – who was also the first rector –, J.P.E. Hartmann and Holger Simon Paulli on the basis of a testamentary gift from the jeweler P.W. Moldenhauer, and with inspiration from the Leipzig Conservatory and a conservatory founded by Giuseppe Siboni in Copenhagen in 1827. Carl Nielsen was a teacher in the period 1916–1919 and the rector during the last year of his life.

The academy was renamed to Det Kongelige Danske Musikkonservatorium in 1902 and became a national state institution in 1949. Queen Margrethe II of Denmark is Protector of the institution.

Originally located on H.C. Andersens Boulevard, it relocated into Radiohuset, the former headquarters of the Danish national radio broadcasting corporation DR, on 1 September 2008 and took over the concert hall under the name Konservatoriets Koncertsal.

Administration
Rectors of the academy:
 1867–1890: Niels Gade
 1890–1899: Johan Peter Emilius Hartmann
 1899–1915: Otto Malling
 1915–1930: Anton Svendsen
 1930–1931: Carl Nielsen
 1931–1947: Rudolph Simonsen
 1947–1954: Christian Christiansen
 1954–1955: Finn Høffding
 1956–1967: Knudåge Riisager
 1967–1971: Svend Westergaard
 1971–1975: Poul Birkelund
 1976–1979: Friedrich Gürtler
 1979–1986: Anne-Karin Høgenhaven
 1992–2007: Steen Pade
 2007–2019: Bertel Krarup
 Since 2019: Uffe Savery

References

External links
 Official website 

 
Music schools in Denmark
Education in Copenhagen
Culture in Copenhagen
Organizations based in Denmark with royal patronage
Educational institutions established in 1867
1867 establishments in Denmark